Calendar Girl is a 1993 American comedy-drama film starring Jason Priestley, Gabriel Olds, and Jerry O'Connell. 
The film was directed by John Whitesell and written by Paul W. Shapiro. Set in 1962, it tells the story of three young men who go on a trip to Hollywood to fulfill their dream of meeting Marilyn Monroe. It has similarities to the real-life story of Gene Scanlon, who in 1953 crossed America with a friend and had a date with Marilyn Monroe for which she paid the bill.

Plot
While Marilyn Monroe is enjoying her rise to stardom and iconic pop culture status, a trio of childhood friends happly, and surreptitiously obtain racy pictures of her for their pubescent enjoyment. 

Once they mature (at least by age), Roy has his eyes set on joining the Military despite his strained relationship with his father. His buddy, Scott, has a prosthetic leg and is to be married soon to his darling significant other Becky.  Their pal Ned, known affectionately as "Bleuer," works at a small town store.

Thanks to Roy's Uncle, the three desirous and hapless friends shack up at his place in California, where they yearn to meet—if only for a brief second—the fabulous and stunning Miss Marilyn Monroe. Their quest leads to shenanigans, and silliness ensues as they arrange the most brainless ideas to win over their idol. One includes corralling a "sad" cow to moo outside of Miss Monroe's luxurious residence, another has the guys speeding after Marilyn towards a nude beach, while an entirely separate subplot has them dodging some bad guys that are after Roy.

Eventually, it is up to Marilyn to pity the trio's collectively desperate agony. The boys devise a clever scheme to avoid Miss Monroe's hawkish maid, and Roy haplessly asks Miss Monroe for a date. This leads to further despair amongst the trio. They begin to regret coming out for the trip and they decide to go out on the town one last time.

In a sudden twist, Monroe finally does agree to a date upon the sandy splendor of the Californian beach. Initially, while resentment has grown between the three friends, Roy is designated to be the lucky one that gets to hopefully "canoe" Miss Monroe, but he passes off the opportunity to his buddy "Bleuer."  He agrees, and treats the lovely Miss Monroe to a platonic, but wonderful night.

While Roy (in his macho way) is disappointed by Bleuer's effort, the boys return home to the sad news that Marilyn has abruptly died of a drug overdose. 

Back home, Scott continues his plans to marry his love, Becky, and Roy tussles with his father in the gym which leads to one last touching moment between the two before Roy is shipped out to boot camp. 

The film's last image is of Bleuer as he embraces his wild side and partakes in a telephone booth gathering that enchants a local college girl in his favor.

Cast

Production 
Producer Debbie Robins first brought the script, originally titled Me and Monroe, to Penny Marshall with the intent of Marshall directing. However, Marshall decided to direct the film Awakenings instead. Marshall retained executive producer credits through her production company, Parkway Productions. 

Filming began on March 23, 1992, and concluded that May.

Casting controversy
Columbia Pictures did a nationwide search for a hearing-impaired actor to portray the deaf character Arturo Gallo, with thousands of deaf actors auditioning for the part. Ultimately the role went to Kurt Fuller, a hearing actor. Producers reasoned they could not find a deaf actor who fit the character’s description as "6 foot 3 and Italian-looking". Columbia hired a sign language interpreter to train Fuller and ensure accuracy in his portrayal. The decision to cast a hearing actor as a deaf character ignited criticism in the deaf community, and the National Association of the Deaf organized protests in several cities across the country to coincide with the film’s release date.

Release
Calendar Girl film was originally planned for a release in April 1993, but this was delayed to August. It premiered on September 3, 1993 and grossed $2,570,550 domestically.

Reception
The film received mostly negative reviews, with criticisms centered on some of the plot’s improbabilities, particularly when the boys arrive in Hollywood and begin tracking down Monroe, in addition to the contrivances of the script.  Owen Gleiberman of Entertainment Weekly wrote, "The film revives the voyeuristic smarminess of early-’80s spring-break comedies, only now it’s passed off as soulful nostalgia." Johanna Steinmetz of the Chicago Tribune commented the film "is all surface, with no depth of emotional field. We are told that each boy matures as a result of this caper, but we can't see it happen."

In a positive review, John Hartl of The Seattle Times wrote, "Sweet and airy and pleasantly nostalgic, Jason Priestley's first starring vehicle is cotton-candy entertainment for summer's end", and praised the chemistry of the three leads, saying they "form a natural ensemble". Emanuel Levy of Variety gave a largely negative review, but conceded "what Shapiro and first-time director John Whitesell do get right is the dynamics of the group, specifically Priestley’s leadership as a combination of persuasion, intimidation and manipulation". 

Hartl said the film’s glaring point is its script, which he said "never goes far enough". Writing for the Los Angeles Times, Michael Wilmington wrote, "And that's one of the things that's a little off about it: the suggestion that the dream isn't much different than the truth, that real-life Marilyn was exactly as she seemed in the movies."

On review aggregate website Rotten Tomatoes, Calendar Girl has an approval rating of 11% based on 19 reviews.

Home media 
Calendar Girl was released on DVD by Sony Pictures Home on August 7, 2012.

References

External links
 
 
 
 

1993 films
1990s buddy comedy-drama films
Columbia Pictures films
1990s English-language films
1990s coming-of-age comedy-drama films
American coming-of-age comedy-drama films
American buddy comedy-drama films
Films about Marilyn Monroe
Films about Hollywood, Los Angeles
Films set in Los Angeles
Films set in Nevada
Films directed by John Whitesell
Films scored by Hans Zimmer
Teen sex comedy films
1993 directorial debut films
Films set in 1962
Casting controversies in film